Robert Holt was an Australian politician.

Robert or Bob Holt may also refer to:

 Robert Holt (American football) (born 1959), American football player
 Robert Holt (timber merchant) (1833–1909), New Zealand builder, undertaker, timber merchant and sawmiller
 Robert Durning Holt (1832–1908), English cotton-broker and mayor of Liverpool
 Robert R. Holt (born 1917), American psychologist
 Bob Holt (actor) (1928–1985), American actor
 Bob Holt (athlete) (born 1944), English distance runner
 Bob Holt (fiddler) (1930–2004), American fiddler

See also
Robert Holte (died 1679), of the Holte baronets